The O'Reilly Open Source Award is presented to individuals for dedication, innovation, leadership and outstanding contribution to open source. From 2005 to 2009 the award was known as the Google–O'Reilly Open Source Award but since 2010 the awards have only carried the O'Reilly name.

Award winners
This is a list of the winners of individuals that won the annual O'Reilly Open Source Awards.

2005
 Best Communicator: Doc Searls (co-author of "The Cluetrain Manifesto" and Senior Editor for Linux Journal)
 Best Evangelist: Jeff Waugh (Ubuntu Linux and Gnome desktop environment)
 Best Diplomat: Geir Magnusson Jr
 Best Integrator: D. Richard Hipp (SQLite)
 Best Hacker: David Heinemeier Hansson (Ruby on Rails and 37Signals)

2006
 Best Legal Eagle: Cliff Schmidt (Apache License)
 Best Community Activist: Gervase Markham (programmer) (Firefox)
 Best Toolmaker: Julian Seward (Valgrind)
 Best Corporate Liaison: Stefan Taxhet (OpenOffice.org)
 Best All-around Developer: Peter Lundblad (Subversion)

2007
 Best Community Builder: Karl Fogel
 Best FUD Fighter: Pamela Jones
 Best Accessibility Architect: Aaron Leventhal
 Best Strategist: David Recordon 
 Best Outstanding Lifetime Contributions: Paul Vixie

2008
 Best Community Amplifier: Chris Messina - BarCamp, Microformats and Spread Firefox
 Best Contributor: Angela Byron - Drupal
 Best Education Enabler: Martin Dougiamas - Moodle
 Best Interoperator: Andrew Tridgell - Samba and Rsync
 Defender of Rights: Harald Welte - gpl-violations.org

2009
 Best Open Source Database Hacker: Brian Aker - Drizzle and MySQL
 Database Jedi Master: Bruce Momjian - PostgreSQL
 Best Community Builder: Clay Johnson - Sunlight Labs
 Best Social Networking Hacker: Evan Prodromou - identi.ca and Laconica
 Best Education Hacker: Penny Leach - Mahara and Moodle

2010
 Jeremy Allison - Samba
 Deborah Bryant
 Brad Fitzpatrick - memcached, Gearman, MogileFS, and OpenID
 Leslie Hawthorn - Google's Summer of Code
 Greg Stein - Subversion, Apache, Python

2011
 Fabrice Bellard - QEMU, FFmpeg
 Karen Sandler - SFLC, licensing
 Keith Packard - X Window System
 Ryan Dahl - Node.js
 Kohsuke Kawaguchi - Jenkins

2012
 Massimo Banzi
 Jim Jagielski
 Christie Koehler
 Bradley M. Kuhn
 Elizabeth Krumbach

2013
 Behdad Esfahbod - HarfBuzz
 Jessica McKellar - Python Software Foundation
 Limor Fried - Adafruit Industries
 Valerie Aurora - Ada Initiative
 Paul Fenwick - Perl
 Martin Michlmayr - Debian Project

2014
 Sage Weil - Ceph
 Deb Nicholson - MediaGoblin and OpenHatch.org
 John "Warthog9" Hawley - gitweb and Linux kernel site kernel.org
 Erin Petersen - Outercurve Foundation and Girl Develop It
 Patrick Volkerding - Slackware Linux

2015
 Doug Cutting
 Sarah Mei
 Christopher Webber
 Stefano Zacchiroli
 Marina Zhurakhinskaya

2016
 Sage Sharp
 Rikki Endsley
 VM (Vicky) Brasseur
 Máirín Duffy
 Marijn Haverbeke

2017
 William John Sullivan, Executive Director, Free Software Foundation.
 Nithya Ruff, Head of Open Source Program Office at Amazon, Linux Foundation, Boards of Directors.
 Tony Sebro, General Counsel, Software Freedom Conservancy; Outreachy coordinator.
 Katie McLaughlin, BeeWare / KatieConf.
 Juan González Gómez, R&D Engineer & Member of the CloneWars and FPGAwars communities

2018
In 2018 the winner of each award was determined through open voting from nominees selected by O'Reilly. 
 Most Impact Award: Kubernetes
 Breakout Project of the Year: HashiCorp - Vault
 Lifetime Achievement Award: Linux

2019
 Most Impact Award: Let's Encrypt
 Breakout Project of the Year: Kotlin
 Lifetime Achievement Award: PostgreSQL

See also

 List of computer-related awards
 List of computer science awards

References

External links
 Google-O'Reilly Open Source Awards - Hall of Fame
 O'Reilly Open Source Awards 2010
 OSCON 2010: O'Reilly Open Source Awards (photo)
 OSCON 2011: O'Reilly Open Source Awards
 OSCON 2011: O'Reilly Open Source Awards (video)
 Geek Feminism Wiki: Google O'Reilly Open Source Award

Lists of award winners
Free-software awards
Free software
Computer science awards
O'Reilly Media
Awards established in 2005